Hubert Julian "Jay" Stowitts was an American painter and ballet dancer.

Jay Stowitts was born on June 26, 1892 in Rushville, Nebraska. His family moved to Los Angeles and Stowitts attended the University of California, Berkeley, from 1911-1915. At Cal he was captain of the track team. He joined the dance company of Anna Pavlova and toured the world with her, performing in works such as La Peri.

For the 1936 Summer Olympics in Berlin, Stowitts painted a series of nudes with Olympic athletes such as Woody Strode, Briggs Hunt, William Golden, Bobby Riggs, and Frank Kurtz.

Stowitts died in 1953.

References

External links

http://www.stowitts.org/about.html
Hubert Stowitts at Gay Bears
The art of Hubert Stowitts

20th-century American painters
20th-century American ballet dancers
American gay artists
LGBT dancers
1892 births
1953 deaths